Medicago arborea is a flowering plant species in the pea and bean family Fabaceae. Common names include moon trefoil, shrub medick, alfalfa arborea, and tree medick. It is found throughout Europe and especially in the Mediterranean basin, primarily on rocky shores among shrubby vegetation. It forms a symbiotic relationship with the bacterium Sinorhizobium meliloti, which is capable of nitrogen fixation. It is the only member of the genus Medicago which is used as an ornamental. M. arborea is sometimes misidentified as Cytisus, which it resembles.

Description

References

External links
International Legume Database & Information Services
Medicago arborea L.
Medicago arborea - L.

arborea
Flora of Spain
Matorral shrubland
Plants described in 1753
Taxa named by Carl Linnaeus
Flora of Malta